This article show all participating team squads at the 2015 FIVB World Grand Prix, played by twelve countries with the final round held in.

Head coach: Francois Salvagny

Head coach: Guillermo Orduna

Head coach:Mark Barnard

Head coach: Gert Vande Broek

Head coach: José Roberto Guimarães

Head coach:Atanas Lazarov

Head coach: Arnd Ludwig

Head coach: Lang Ping

Head coach: Eduardo Guillaume

Head coach: Angelo Vercesi

Head coach: Carlo Parisi

Head coach: Robert Garcia Garcia

Head coach:Cristian Cruz

Head coach: Luciano Pedullà

Head coach: Marco Bonitta

Head coach: Masayoshi Manabe

Head coach: Oleksandr Gutor

Head coach: David Lung'aho

Head coach:Jorge Azair

Head coach: Giovanni Guidetti

Head coach: Mauro Marasciulo

Head coach: Jacek Nawrocki

Head coach:José Mieles

Head coach: Yuri Marichev

Head coach: Zoran Terzić

Head coach: Kiattipong Radchatagriengkai

Head coach: Ferhat Akbaş

Head coach: Karch Kiraly

References

External links

2015
2015 in volleyball